No. 17 Squadron (Golden Arrows) is a squadron of the Indian Air Force stationed at the Ambala Air Force Station as part of the Western Air Command. The squadron was number-plated in 2016, but was resurrected in Ambala on 11 September 2019 with the Dassault Rafale.

History
No. 17 Squadron was raised in Ambala on 1 October 1951 under the command of Flight Lieutenant D.L. Springett. It initially flew Harvard-II B. It was moved from the East to Delhi during the 1965 Indo-Pakistani War to provide air cover for the capital.

It was awarded its President's Standard on 8 November 1988 at Palam.

Affiliation with the Indian Army
On 4th October 2021, the Squadron's affiliation with the Indian Army's Sikh Light Infantry regiment was formally signed at the Ambala Air Force Station.

The Indian Army Chief M. M. Naravane and Air Commodore Tarun Chaudhry of 17 Squadron signed the charter of affiliation.

Feature Film based on the Golden Arrows

A film is being produced on the Golden Arrows squadron based on the 1999 Kargil war, named 'Golden Arrows'. The film is dedicated to Sqn Ldr Ajay Ahuja who was flight commander of 17 Squadron, Golden Arrows. Wing commander Birender Singh Dhanoa was the Squadron Commander who later became the Air Chief Marshal of the Indian Air Force. The film is being directed by Kushal Srivastava.

Aircraft
Aircraft types operated by the squadron:

References

017
Military units and formations established in 1951
1951 establishments in India